Desiet Kidane Teketse (10 October 2000 – 8 November 2021) was an Eritrean professional racing cyclist, who rode for UCI Women's Continental Team . She rode in the women's road race at the 2019 UCI Road World Championships in Yorkshire, England.

She died after being hit by a car while training in Asmara, Eritrea.

References

External links
 

2000 births
2021 deaths
Eritrean female cyclists
Place of birth missing
Cyclists at the 2018 Summer Youth Olympics
Cycling road incident deaths
Road incident deaths in Eritrea
Sport deaths in Africa